Erodium laciniatum is a species of flowering plant in the family Geraniaceae.

Sources

References 

laciniatum
Flora of Malta
Taxa named by Antonio José Cavanilles